Konnarock is an unincorporated community in Washington County and Smyth County, Virginia in the U.S. state of Virginia.
Konnarock Training School was listed on the National Register of Historic Places in 1997.

References

Unincorporated communities in Virginia
Unincorporated communities in Washington County, Virginia